The 2015 New York Red Bulls season was the franchise's twentieth season in Major League Soccer, the top division of soccer in the United States.

Roster transactions

In

Out

Loaned out

Draft picks

Team information

Squad information
As of August 05, 2015.

Competitions

Preseason

Major League Soccer season

Tables

Eastern Conference Table

Overall Table

MLS Cup Playoffs

Conference semifinals

Conference finals

U.S. Open Cup

New York Red Bulls will enter the 2015 U.S. Open Cup with the rest of Major League Soccer in the fourth round.

International Champions Cup

Player statistics

|-
|colspan="12"|Players who left the club during the season

|-
|colspan="12"|Out on Loan

Top scorers

As of 29 November 2015.

Assist Leaders

As of 29 November 2015.
This table does not include secondary assists.

Clean Sheets

As of 29 November 2015.

See also

 2015 in American soccer

References

New York Red Bulls
New York Red Bulls seasons
New York Red Bulls
New York Red Bulls
2015